The 1977–78 National Football League was the 47th staging of the National Football League (NFL), an annual Gaelic football tournament for the Gaelic Athletic Association county teams of Ireland.

Dublin beat Mayo in the final.

Format

Group stage

Division One (North)

Table

Division One (South)

Table

Division Two (North)

Group A play-offs

Group B play-offs

Inter-group play-offs

Group A Table

Group B Table

Division Two (South)

Group A play-offs

Group B play-offs

Inter-group play-offs

Group A Table

Group B Table

Knockout stage

Quarter-finals

Semi-finals

Final

References

National Football League
National Football League
National Football League (Ireland) seasons